Bill Black (1926–1965) was an American bassist and bandleader.

Bill Black may also refer to:
William K. Black (born 1951), American lawyer, academic, author and a former bank regulator
Bill Black (second baseman) (1899–1968), American baseball player
Bill Black (baseball coach) (1920–2002), American former college baseball coach and construction company executive
Bill Black (businessman) (born 1950), Canadian insurance industry executive and politician
Bill Black (comics), American publisher and editor of AC Comics, and freelance penciller and inker
Bill Black (pilot) (1943/1944–2020), New Zealand pilot
Bill Black (rugby union) (1928–2019), Scottish rugby union player
Bill Black (voice director) (born 1960), American musician, voice director and sound effects designer born William Thomas Blackwell III
Buckskin Bill Black (1929–2018), long-running children's television host and later school board member in Baton Rouge, Louisiana

See also 
William Black (disambiguation)
Billy Black (character), a character in Stephenie Meyer's Twilight series